Joseph Heinrich von Schomacker (transcribed Iosif Andreyevič Šomaker; born May 31, 1859 in Dünamünde/Daugavgrīva near Riga, Russian Empire; † July 17, 1931 in Kötzschenbroda, German Empire) was a Baltic German physician, sailor and Olympic medalist. Schomacker at the 1912 Olympic Games with the russian imperial team Gallia II won a bronze medal in sailing in the 10 Metre class. The owner of the yacht was Aleksandr Vyshnegradsky, the father of the Russian composer Ivan Vyshnegradsky.

References

Sources
 
 

1859 births
1931 deaths
Russian male sailors (sport)
Sailors at the 1912 Summer Olympics – 10 Metre
Olympic sailors of Russia
Olympic bronze medalists for Russia
Olympic medalists in sailing
Medalists at the 1912 Summer Olympics